White Snow of Russia is a 1980 Soviet drama film directed by Yuri Vyshinsky.

Plot 
The film tells about the chess player Alexander Alekhine, who became the world champion.

Details 
Runtime: 91 minutes 

Country: Soviet Union

Language: Russian

Release Date: March 2, 1981

Also Known As: Belyy sneg Rossii

Cast 
 Aleksandr Mikhaylov as Alexander Alekhine
 Vladimir Samoylov as Aleksandr Kuprin
 Yuri Kayurov as Nikolai Krylenko
 Natalya Gundareva as Nadezhda
 Krystyna Mikolajewska as Grace Wishard
 Vsevolod Yakut as Emanuel Lasker
 Boris Galkin as Salo Flohr
 Aleksandr Goloborodko as Valentin Volyanksy
 Olegar Fedoro as Mikhailov   
 Vladimir Pitsek as Francisco Lupi
 Aleksandr Pashutin as Semyonov

References

External links 
 

1980 films
1980s Russian-language films
Soviet drama films
Mosfilm films
Films about chess
1980 in chess
1980 drama films
Russian sports drama films
Drama films based on actual events
Sports films based on actual events
Biographical films about sportspeople
Films set in 1927